Ripabottoni is a comune (municipality) in the Province of Campobasso in the Italian region Molise, located about  northeast of Campobasso.

Ripabottoni borders the following municipalities: Bonefro, Campolieto, Casacalenda, Monacilioni, Morrone del Sannio, Provvidenti, Sant'Elia a Pianisi.

Famous People from Ripabottoni
Arturo Giovannitti, labor organizer in the United States, born in Ripabottoni
Tony Volpentest, his paternal family came from Ripabottoni, the original name was Volpentesta.

Transportation 
Ripabottoni is served by a railway station, the Ripabottoni-S:Elia railway station, on the Termoli-Campobasso and Termoli–Venafro line.

Demographic evolution

References

Cities and towns in Molise